Sleeman is an English surname. Notable people with the surname include:

 Anita Sleeman (1930–2011), married name of American-Canadian music composer Anita Andrés
 Colin Sleeman (1914–2006), British judge 
 Derek H. Sleeman, British professor 
 Frank Sleeman (1915–2000), Australian politician
 Fred Sleeman (1885–1953), Australian rules footballer
 George Sleeman (1841–1926), Canadian brewer and politician
 Joseph Sleeman (1885–1970), Australian politician
 Lance Sleeman (1885–1968), Australian rules footballer
 Thomas Sleeman (1813–1896), British archdeacon
 William Henry Sleeman (1788–1856), British colonial administrator

See also
 Sleeman (disambiguation)

English-language surnames